Cain and Abel is a 2006 American independent urban comedy film written and directed by Shane Woodson.

Production
Woodson spent a year revising his script. The concept took three years to bring to film and was shot in 42 days. Post-production was completed in September 2005, screened at several festivals through 2006, before purchase and release in 2007 by Maverick Entertainment Group.

Background
The film follows the mis-adventures of on-the-take good-hearted LA cops John Abel and Malcolm Cain. Set in modern Los Angeles, the film uses a 1970s feel, with the leads dressed in 1970s garb and driving a 1969 Chevy.

The film includes supporting roles by TV reality star Flavor Flav, as Slim Jim, and Terrence Flack from TV's Everybody Hates Chris and The Shield, as Malcolm Cain. Other supporting roles are played by Shane Woodson from Zodiac, Resident Evil: Extinction, NBC's Las Vegas television series and Sarah Jones.

Cast
 Shane Woodson as John Abel
 Terrence Flack as Malcolm Cain
 Flavor Flav as Slim Jim
 Scott L. Schwartz as Yuri
 Bridget Powers as Little Vito
 Sarah Jones as Jennifer Proctor
 Yogi as Lt. Carter
 Christy Oldham as Evette Spelling
 Lola Davidson as Angela Addison
 Jason Fulk as Lt. Proctor
 Carlos Love as Big G
 Bob Campbell as The Chief
 Nathan Inzerillo as Manush
 Tonya Jeanaye as Pearl
 Hans Uder as Constantine Federov
 Igor Jadrovski as Dmitri Federov

Recognition
John Wirt of The Advocate wrote that the film was a "pure comedy" that "plays like Starsky & Hutch meets Superfly".

Accolades
 2006, Audience Choice Award, Other Venice Film Festival
 2006, Official Selection, Dances With Films Film Festival

References

External links
 
 
 Cain and Abel at Maverick Entertainment

2006 films
2006 comedy films
Films set in Los Angeles
American independent films
2000s English-language films
2000s American films